Matthias Langkamp (born 24 February 1984) is a German former professional footballer who played as a defender.

Club career
Born in Speyer, Langkamp first signed professional terms with Arminia Bielefeld and enjoyed an impressive debut season in the Bundesliga in the 2004–05 season, earning rave reviews and a call-up to the international setup with the Germany U21. Considered a very promising young talent at that time, he courted the attention of a host of bigger clubs and was eventually bought by VfL Wolfsburg. However, there he had a falling out with manager Holger Fach, who relegated Langkamp to the reserve team and only granted him one appearance for the first team before offloading him to Swiss club Grasshoppers.

After a season in Switzerland, Langkamp returned to his former club Arminia Bielefeld  and at the beginning of the season he enjoyed a remarkable return to form. However, after a strong challenge during a match against MSV Duisburg, strangely Langkamp appeared to still be concussed even a week after the match. Upon return from his injury, Langkamp suffered a dramatic loss of form and confidence. After his error led to a crucial goal for opponents Energie Cottbus, he had to endure a very public on-pitch dressing down from his teammates. He fell out of favour for the remainder of the season and rarely featured in the first team again.

Langkamp was not offered a new contract by Arminia Bielefeld, who released him at the end of the 2007–08 season. He then secured a contract with Panionios in the Super League Greece and played a number of games for them in the 2008–09 season, becoming a popular figure amongst the local fans.

He returned to Germany after one season, signing with Karlsruher SC on 29 June 2009. In his first season back in Germany however, his attempts to re-establish himself were thwarted by injury. Although he found himself out of the side initially, he later forced his way into the team and looked impressive, showing off his attacking threat by scoring two goals in successive games. However, just as he was gaining momentum, in November he went into the treatment room complaining of a pain in his hamstrings; upon investigation, the physio found that he would need an operation on his Achilles tendon. When he went in for the operation, the surgeon discovered that he would actually need operations on both of his Achilles tendons.

The operations kept Langkamp on the sidelines until late March 2010. He made his comeback against Hansa Rostock, coming on as a late substitute and playing for two minutes. But his next substitute appearance proved to be a disaster – with his first tackle he conceded a penalty and with his second tackle he injured himself, damaging his left shoulder joint and effectively ending his season as he required surgery.

Langkamp fought his way back to fitness in time for the 2010–11 season and was involved in the pre-season build-up. On 19 July 2010, Langkamp's injury jinx struck again and threatened to derail his season when he slipped up attempting a sprint, tearing a muscle in his right thigh.

However, the player showed remarkable resilience to overcome this latest injury and fought his way back by mid-August. He wasted no time in proving himself a remarkable talent at this level and his experience and leadership skills shone through as he quickly established himself as the lynchpin of the defence and one of the first names on the Karlsruher SC team-sheet. Allowed a relatively injury-free run in the team for the first time in years, Langkamp earned rave reviews and showed the defensive skills that had once made him one of the most coveted defenders in Germany. His powerful physique and heading ability saw him sometimes deployed up-front as an emergency striker, which proved justified when he volleyed in the equalising goal in a crucial match against relegation rivals VfL Osnabrück. The goal proved decisive in securing the club's status in the 2. Bundesliga and earned Langkamp legendary status amongst the Karlsruher SC fans.

In a shock move which caused uproar amongst some sections of the fanbase, Karlsruher SC decided against renew Langkamp's contract, citing that they could not afford their star defender's wage demands. Whilst trying to maintain fitness, searching for a new club, tragedy struck when Langkamp suffered a broken leg in a freak training accident. The serious injury scuppered his attempts to find a club for new season and complications with the rehabilitation have led to a pro-longed recovery period, but Langkamp is now back to full fitness and looking to return to the game.

International career
Langkamp played two games for the Germany under-21 national team.

Personal life
His brother Sebastian Langkamp is a professional footballer as well.

References

External links
 
 

Living people
1984 births
People from Speyer
German footballers
Footballers from Rhineland-Palatinate
Association football defenders
Germany under-21 international footballers
Germany B international footballers
Bundesliga players
2. Bundesliga players
Swiss Super League players
Super League Greece players
Arminia Bielefeld players
VfL Wolfsburg players
Grasshopper Club Zürich players
Panionios F.C. players
Karlsruher SC players
German expatriate footballers
German expatriate sportspeople in Switzerland
Expatriate footballers in Switzerland
German expatriate sportspeople in Greece
Expatriate footballers in Greece